Iryna Fedorivna Sanina (born 8 October 1985) is a Ukrainian footballer who plays as a goalkeeper for Romanian club ACS Heniu Prundu Bârgăului and the Ukraine women's national team.

On 23 September 2022 she announced of her retirement from the national team. She made her first appearance for team back in 2013 but has been called up as early as 2003. In total Sanina recorded 17 official matches for the Ukraine national team.

References

External links 
 
 
 Roman Kyrienko. Iryna Sanina: We have football uniform assigned to each player, therefore after game it is necessary to iron it (Ірина САНІНА: «У нас за кожним гравцем закріплена футбольна форма, тож після матчів доводиться її прасувати»). Ukrayinskyi Futbol. 14 March 2015.

1985 births
Living people
Sportspeople from Donetsk
Ukrainian women's footballers
Women's association football goalkeepers
WFC Donchanka Donetsk players
WFC Zhytlobud-1 Kharkiv players
FC Kolos Kovalivka players
Ukrainian expatriate women's footballers
Ukrainian expatriate sportspeople in Romania
Expatriate women's footballers in Romania